Sofiya Zinovevna Magarill (Russian - Со́фья Зино́вьевна Магари́лл;  (5 April 1900 – 15 October 1943, Alma-Ata) was a Soviet film actress.

Life
In 1925 she graduated from the A. Morozov theatre studio, after studying in FEKS workshops led by Grigori Kozintsev and Leonid Trauberg - she had married Kozintsev in 1923 and remained his wife until her death. Her first film was in 1924 and she also trained under Boris Sohn at the Lenfilm acting school between 1933 and 1936. She worked at the Leningrad New Theatre and from 1941 in Alma-Ata. She died of typhoid fever during the evacuation of Alma-Ata, which she had caught whilst nursing Sergei Yermolinsky.

Filmography
 The Club of the Big Deed (1927)
 Kastus Kalinovskiy (1928)
 The New Babylon (1929)
 Cities and Years (1930)
 Lieutenant Kijé (1934)
 Masquerade (1941)
 The Murderers are Coming (1942)

External links
http://www.bulvar.com.ua/arch/2013/20/5193bf3fb958b/

Soviet film actresses
1900 births
1943 deaths
Deaths from typhoid fever